Bandanna, also known as Pleasant Hill, is an unincorporated area in York County, Pennsylvania, United States. Bandanna is located on Pennsylvania Route 94 about 3 miles south of Hanover.

References

Unincorporated communities in York County, Pennsylvania
Unincorporated communities in Pennsylvania